Easy Street is an American sitcom television series created by Hugh Wilson and Andy Borowitz, starring Loni Anderson that aired for 22 episodes on NBC from September 13, 1986 to April 29, 1987.

Overview
The series stars Loni Anderson as L.K. McGuire, a onetime showgirl who manages to nab a young wealthy husband, Ned McGuire, only to have him die and leave her fending for herself against his embittered sister, who's out to get L.K. out of the picture and away from her inherited money.  Meanwhile, L.K. reconnects with a down-on-his-luck uncle, Bully Stevenson (Jack Elam) who has been on and off the streets of Los Angeles.  L.K. invites him and his pal, Ricardo Williams (Lee Weaver), to move into her vast mansion, to the horror and consternation of her snobbish in-laws, Eleanor and Quentin Standard (Dana Ivey and James Cromwell).  

Quentin tends to be a bit more tolerant and friendly to L.K. and her family, but the snobbish Eleanor can't stand them, and does everything possible to get rid of them all.  Arthur Malet co-stars as Bobby, the McGuire's butler.

Cast
Loni Anderson as L.K. McGuire
Jack Elam as Uncle Alvin "Bully" Stevenson
Lee Weaver as Ricardo Williams
Dana Ivey as Eleanor Standard
James Cromwell as Quentin Standard
Arthur Malet as Bobby

Episodes

External links

1986 American television series debuts
1987 American television series endings
1980s American sitcoms
English-language television shows
NBC original programming
Television series by CBS Studios
Television series created by Andy Borowitz
Television series created by Hugh Wilson
Television shows set in Los Angeles